Генератор Зла (Russian for Generator of Evil) is the seventh studio album by Russian heavy metal band Aria.

Track listing

Personnel
Valery Kipelov - Vocals
Vladimir Holstinin - Guitar, Acoustic Guitar, Keyboards on Track 10
Sergey Terent'ev - Guitar, Keyboards on Tracks 2, 9
Vitaly Dubinin - Bass, Vocals, Keyboards on Tracks 1,3,5,7,8
Aleksandr Maniakin - Drums
Aria - Management
Andrei Subbotin - Mastering
Nadir Chan'shev - Photography
Pavel Semenov - Design

References

1998 albums
Aria (band) albums